Gustaf Adolf Jonsson (26 June 1879 – 30 April 1949) was a Swedish sport shooter who competed at the 1908, the 1912 and the 1920 Summer Olympics.

In 1908 he won the silver medal in the team free rifle event.

In the team military rifle event he finished fifth and in the 300 metre free rifle competition he finished 15th.

Four years later he won the gold medal as member of the Swedish free rifle.

In the 300 metre free rifle, three positions event he finished eleventh and in the 300 metre military rifle, three positions competition he finished 16th.

In 1920 he won the bronze medal as part of the Swedish 600 metre military rifle, prone team.

In the 300 and 600 metre team military rifle, prone event he finished sixth. He also participated in the 300 metre military rifle, prone competition and in the 600 metre military rifle, prone event but his exact place is unknown.

References

External links
Profile

1879 births
1949 deaths
Swedish male sport shooters
ISSF rifle shooters
Olympic shooters of Sweden
Shooters at the 1908 Summer Olympics
Shooters at the 1912 Summer Olympics
Shooters at the 1920 Summer Olympics
Olympic gold medalists for Sweden
Olympic silver medalists for Sweden
Olympic bronze medalists for Sweden
Olympic medalists in shooting
Medalists at the 1908 Summer Olympics
Medalists at the 1912 Summer Olympics
Medalists at the 1920 Summer Olympics
Sport shooters from Stockholm
19th-century Swedish people
20th-century Swedish people